Mali competed at the 2020 Summer Paralympics in Tokyo, Japan, from 24 August to 5 September 2021.

Athletics

Two athletes represented Mali in athletics.

Men's track

Women's field

See also 
 Mali at the Paralympics
 Mali at the 2020 Summer Olympics

References 

Nations at the 2020 Summer Paralympics
2020
Summer Paralympics